John Bennett, known as DJ Freak, is an English hardcore music DJ and producer. He is credited as one of the first pioneers of the industrial hardcore/speedcore sound.

Musical career
DJ Freak has released over 50 albums to date. He was one of the early pioneers of hardcore and speedcore music in 1992. He has been released on his own two labels, Boneheddz and Hard of Hearing, and other labels such as Killout, Epitaph and Deadly Systems. In 2011, he began releasing side project material in a different style, dark spacey minimal looped abstract techno. He releases these as free downloads, on his pages on SoundCloud and Bandcamp.

Hard Of Hearing
In the early 1990s, DJ Freak founded the label Hard Of Hearing. It was geared towards subgenres of electronic music such as gabber and hardcore. Practically every release on this label was a DJ Freak release, however, other artists did make appearances on these albums. His most recognised and seminal work was released on Killout. The Hard Of Hearing label ended in 1998.

In 2009, DJ Freak released an album called Hard Of Hearing Reloaded.

Discography

References

External sources
DJ Freak on Discogs
DJ Freak Fan Page on Myspace
Hard Of Hearing
B.E.A.S.T. Records

British electronic musicians
Hardcore techno music groups